Max Nonne (13 January 1861, Hamburg – 12 August 1959, Hamburg) was a German neurologist.

Biography 
Max Nonne received his early education at the Gelehrtenschule des Johanneums in Hamburg, and later studied medicine at the universities of Heidelberg, Freiburg, and Berlin, obtaining his doctorate in 1884. After graduation, he served as an assistant in the Heidelberg medical clinic under Wilhelm Heinrich Erb (1840-1921) and in the surgical clinic in Kiel under Johannes Friedrich August von Esmarch (1823-1908), then in 1889 returned to Hamburg as a neurologist. During the same year, he became head physician in the department of internal medicine at the Red Cross Hospital. In 1896 he was appointed director of neurology at Eppendorf Hospital, Hamburg.

Nonne became a titular professor of neurology in 1913, and in 1919 began teaching classes in neurology at the newly founded University of Hamburg, where in 1925 he became professor ordinarius. Here he worked with Alfons Maria Jakob (1884-1931).

Max Nonne was one of the four physicians asked to investigate Vladimir Ilich Lenin during the Russian leaders' final disease.

See also 
 Friedrich Meggendorfer

Associated eponyms 
 Nonne-Apelt reaction: Sensitive method for demonstrating fibrin-globulin in liquor cerebrospinalis.
 Nonne-Milroy-Meige disease: Chronic familial lymphoedema of the limbs.

Selected writings 
 Syphilis und Nervensystem. Berlin, 1902; fifth edition – 1924. (Translated into English and Spanish).
 Diagnose und Therapie der syphilogenen Erkrankungen des Zentralnervensystems. Halle, 1913. 47 pages.

Notes

References
 Max Nonne at Who Named It

External links
 
 

1861 births
1959 deaths
Heidelberg University alumni
University of Freiburg alumni
Humboldt University of Berlin alumni
Academic staff of the University of Hamburg
People educated at the Gelehrtenschule des Johanneums
German neurologists